I Lived to Tell It All is an album by country music artist George Jones, released on August 13, 1996, on the MCA Nashville Records label. It was also a companion piece to his best-selling autobiography of the same name, I Lived to Tell It All.

Background
Coming off his successful reunion tour with ex-wife Tammy Wynette, Jones reunited with producer Norro Wilson to record his sixth album with MCA Nashville.  While Jones remained committed to "pure country", he worked with the top musicians and songwriters of the day and the quality of his work remained high, even though his age kept him off mainstream country radio.  Earlier in the year, Jones released his autobiography I Lived To Tell It All with Tom Carter and the irony of his long career was not lost on him, with the singer writing in its preface, "I also know that a lot of my show-business peers are going to be angry after reading this book. So many have worked so hard to maintain their careers. I never took my career seriously, and yet it's flourishing."  He also pulled no punches about his disappointment in the direction country music had taken, devoting a full chapter to the changes in the country music scene of the 1990s that saw him removed from radio playlists in favor of a younger generation of pop-influenced country stars.  Despite his absence from the country charts during this time, latter-day country superstars such as George Strait, Randy Travis, Alan Jackson, and many others often paid tribute to Jones while expressing their love and respect for his legacy as a true country legend who paved the way for their own success.

Jones promoted the album heavily and it rose to 26 on the Billboard country albums chart, a respectable showing considering his lack of radio support.  He also made a music video for "Honky Tonk Song" which lampooned the infamous episode when Jones rode a lawn mower eight miles to the liquor store after his wife had hidden his car keys (Jones also performed the song on The Late Show with David Letterman).  The album contains the novelty single "Billy B. Bad", a sarcastic jab at country music establishment trendsetters (unsurprisingly, it did not chart), and "Hello Heart", which was co-written by Jones's former 1960s duet partner Melba Montgomery.

Reception
AllMusic calls I Lived To Tell It All "a surprising return to form" for Jones, enthusing, "There are honky tonk raveups, there are heart-tugging barroom weepers, and, best of all, there are several novelties that rank among the most clever and self-deprecating that Jones has ever recorded."  In a Rolling Stone article at the time of the album's release, Chuck Dean wrote that Jones was "...blessed with the best set of lungs this side of the cosmos..."  Alana Nash of Amazon.com writes that, even when going through the motions, "Jones remains the kind of singer who inspires awe and wonder..."

Track listing

Personnel

 Harold Bradley – bass guitar, baritone guitar
 Jim Chapman – backing vocals
 Glen Duncan – fiddle
 Paul Franklin – dobro, fiddle
 Gary Buho Gazaway – trumpet
 John Hughey – pedal steel guitar
 Roy Huskey, Jr. – double bass
 George Jones – acoustic guitar, vocals
 Marabeth Jordan – backing vocals
 Jana King – backing vocals
 Millie Kirkham – backing vocals
 Mike Lawler – keyboards
 Paul Leim – drums
 Larry Marrs – backing vocals
 Terry McMillan – harmonica
 Farrell Morris – percussion
 Rodger Morris – keyboards
 Louis Dean Nunley – backing vocals
 Danny Parks – electric guitar
 Don Potter – acoustic guitar
 Julie Reeves – background vocals
 Hargus "Pig" Robbins – piano
 Pete Wade – electric guitar
 Bergen White – backing vocals
 Dennis Wilson – backing vocals
 Curtis Young – backing vocals

External links
George Jones' Official Website
Record Label

1996 albums
George Jones albums
Albums produced by Norro Wilson